The 1998 Houston Astros season was the 37th season for the Major League Baseball (MLB) franchise in Houston, Texas. On the strength of a club record 102 wins, they rocketed to a second consecutive trip to the postseason with an National League Central title. They did not win 100 games again until 2017, while the record for wins would be broken the following year. On September 14, the Astros clinched the division title when the Chicago Cubs lost. The next day, Craig Biggio became the first Astro to collect 200 hits in a season.

Offseason
 December 22, 1997: Rob Butler signed as a free agent with the Houston Astros.

Regular season
First baseman Jeff Bagwell hit his first career grand slam while tying a career-high six runs batted in (RBI) against Cincinnati on September 9 in a 13–7 victory.  It was his 218th career home run, making his streak the then-longest among active players without a grand slam.

Season standings

Record vs. opponents

Notable Transactions
July 31, 1998: Randy Johnson was traded by the Seattle Mariners to the Houston Astros for a player to be named later, Freddy Garcia, and Carlos Guillén. The Houston Astros sent John Halama (October 1, 1998) to the Seattle Mariners to complete the trade.

Roster

Game log

Regular season

|-style="background:#fcc;"
| 1 || March 31 || 4:06p.m. CDT || Giants || L 4–9  || Johnstone (1–0) || Nitkowski (0–1) || — || 4:29 || 43,776 || 0–1 || L1
|-

|-style="background:#cfc;"
| 2 || April 1 || 6:37p.m. CDT || Giants || W 7–6 || Miller (1–0) || Tavarez (0–1) || Wagner (1) || 3:04 || 13,719 || 1–1 || W1
|-style="background:#fcc;"
| 3 || April 2 || 7:05p.m. CDT || Giants || L 2–9 || Rueter (1–0) || Halama (0–1) || — || 3:18 || 15,040 || 1–2 || L1
|-style="background:#cfc;"
| 4 || April 3 || 7:05p.m. CDT || Rockies || W 15–2 || Lima (1–0) || Wright (0–1) || — || 2:47 || 26,026 || 2–2 || W1
|-style="background:#fcc;"
| 5 || April 4 || 7:06p.m. CDT || Rockies || L 3–5 || Thompson (1–0) || Bergman (0–1) || Dipoto (2) || 2:54 || 21,325 || 2–3 || L1
|-style="background:#cfc;"
| 6 || April 5 || 1:36p.m. CDT || Rockies || W 6–2 || Reynolds (1–0) || Kile (1–1) || — || 2:29 || 21,037 || 3–3 || W1
|-style="background:#cfc;"
| 7 || April 6 || 12:37p.m. CDT || Rockies || W 13–4 || Hampton (1–0) || Thomson (1–1) || — || 2:51 || 13,553 || 4–3 || W2
|-style="background:#fcc;"
| 8 || April 7 || 3:11p.m. CDT || @ Giants || L 4–5  || Nen (1–0) || Wagner (0–1) || — || 3:38 || 55,370 || 4–4 || L1
|-style="background:#cfc;"
| 9 || April 8 || 9:05p.m. CDT || @ Giants || W 6–3 || Lima (2–0) || Rueter (1–1) || Wagner (2) || 3:02 || 10,021 || 5–4 || W1
|-style="background:#cfc;"
| 10 || April 9 || 9:04p.m. CDT || @ Giants || W 3–1 || Bergman (1–1) || Gardner (1–1) || Nitkowski (1) || 2:54 || 10,153 || 6–4 || W2
|-style="background:#fcc;"
| 11 || April 10 || 9:07p.m. CDT || @ Dodgers || L 2–7 || Martínez (2–1) || Reynolds (1–1) || — || 2:51 || 34,994 || 6–5 || L1
|-style="background:#cfc;"
| 12 || April 11 || 9:07p.m. CDT || @ Dodgers || W 6–2 || Hampton (2–0) || Dreifort (0–1) || Henry (1) || 2:27 || 40,037 || 7–5 || W1
|-style="background:#fcc;"
| 13 || April 12 || 7:08p.m. CDT || @ Dodgers || L 6–7  || Osuna (1–0) || Wagner (0–2) || — || 3:27 || 33,429 || 7–6 || L1
|-style="background:#fcc;"
| 14 || April 13 || 7:05p.m. CDT || @ Dodgers || L 1–3 || Nomo (1–1) || Lima (2–1) || Radinsky (2) || 2:14 || 32,289 || 7–7 || L2
|-style="background:#fcc;"
| 15 || April 15 || 6:12p.m. CDT || @ Reds || L 1–4 || Tomko (2–1) || Reynolds (1–2) || Shaw (4) || 2:28 || 15,619 || 7–8 || L3
|-style="background:#cfc;"
| 16 || April 16 || 6:30p.m. CDT || @ Reds || W 7–4 || Hampton (3–0) || Weathers (1–1) || Wagner (3) || 3:02 || 14,596 || 8–8 || W1
|-style="background:#cfc;"
| 17 || April 17 || 7:06p.m. CDT || Expos || W 5–3 || Halama (1–1) || Hermanson (1–2) || Wagner (4) || 2:31 || 26,485 || 9–8 || W2
|-style="background:#cfc;"
| 18 || April 18 || 7:05p.m. CDT || Expos || W 4–3 || Henry (1–0) || Batista (0–1) || — || 2:55 || 29,362 || 10–8 || W3
|-style="background:#fcc;"
| 19 || April 19 || 1:37p.m. CDT || Expos || L 4–5 || Telford (2–0) || Magnante (0–1) || Urbina (4) || 2:57 || 18,484 || 10–9 || L1
|-style="background:#cfc;"
| 20 || April 21 || || @ Mets || 6–0 || Hampton (4–0) || Reed (1–2) || — || || 14,774 || 11–9 || W1
|-style="background:#fcc;"
| 21 || April 22 || || @ Mets || 7–10 || Cook (2–0) || Henry (1–1) || — || || 12,772 || 11–10 || L1
|-style="background:#bbb;"
|–|| April 23 || || @ Mets || colspan=8 | Postponed (Rain) (Makeup date: April 27)
|-style="background:#cfc;"
| 22 || April 24 || 6:07p.m. CDT || @ Expos || W 8–4 || Lima (3–1) || Valdes (0–3) || — || 2:49 || 8,713 || 12–10 || W1
|-style="background:#cfc;"
| 23 || April 25 || 6:08p.m. CDT || @ Expos || W 4–3 || Magnante (1–1) || Urbina (1–1) || Wagner (5) || 3:11 || 8,489 || 13–10 || W2
|-style="background:#cfc;"
| 24 || April 26 || 12:38p.m. CDT || @ Expos || W 15–0 || Bergman (2–1) || Moore (1–3) || iller (1) || 2:49 || 9,889 || 14–10 || W3
|-style="background:#cfc;"
| 25 || April 27 || || @ Mets || 4–3 || Nitkowski (1–1) || Franco (0–1) || Wagner (6) || || 17,656 || 15–10 || W4
|-style="background:#cfc;"
| 26 || April 28 || || Mets || 4–3  || Magnante (2–1) || Hudek (0–1) || — || || 14,943 || 16–10 || W5
|-style="background:#cfc;"
| 27 || April 29 || || Mets || 6–1 || Lima (4–1) || Mlicki (0–3) || — || || 14,448 || 17–10 || W6
|-

|-style="background:#cfc;"
| 28 || May 1 || || @ Phillies || 12–5 || Reynolds (2–2) || Beech (0–2) || — || || 11,410 || 18–10 || W7
|-style="background:#cfc;"
| 29 || May 2 || || @ Phillies || 4–1 || Hampton (5–0) || Schilling (3–3) || Wagner (7) || || 18,766 || 19–10 || W8
|-style="background:#fcc;"
| 30 || May 3 || || @ Phillies || 3–5 || Gomes (1–0) || Bergman (2–2) || Leiter (2) || || 21,288 || 19–11 || L1
|-style="background:#cfc;"
| 31 || May 5 || || @ Cubs || 10–5 || Lima (5–1) || Clark (2–4) || Nitkowski (2) || || 21,431 || 20–11 || W1
|-style="background:#fcc;"
| 32 || May 6 || || @ Cubs || 0–2 || Wood (3–2) || Reynolds (2–3) || — || || 15,758 || 20–12 || L1
|-style="background:#fcc;"
| 33 || May 8 || || @ Brewers || 1–4 || Juden (4–1) || Hampton (5–1) || Jones (10) || || 14,711 || 20–13 || L2
|-style="background:#cfc;"
| 34 || May 9 || || @ Brewers || 11–6 || Schourek (1–0) || Eldred (0–2) || — || || 20,145 || 21–13 || W1
|-style="background:#cfc;"
| 35 || May 10 || || @ Brewers || 7–1 || Lima (6–1) || Woodard (2–1) || — || || 19,023 || 22–13 || W2
|-style="background:#cfc;"
| 36 || May 11 || || Marlins || 5–2 || Reynolds (3–3) || Hernandez (2–3) || Wagner (8) || || 14,110 || 23–13 || W3
|-style="background:#cfc;"
| 37 || May 12 || || Marlins || 4–2 || Bergman (3–2) || Hammond (0–1) || Wagner (9) || || 14,919 || 24–13 || W4
|-style="background:#cfc;"
| 38 || May 13 || || Pirates || 1–0 || Hampton (6–1) || Lieber (1–5) || Wagner (10) || || 14,239 || 25–13 || W5
|-style="background:#fcc;"
| 39 || May 14 || || Pirates || 2–7 || Silva (4–3) || Schourek (1–1) || — || || 16,123 || 25–14 || L1
|-style="background:#fcc;"
| 40 || May 15 || || Braves || 2–3 || Neagle (5–1) || Lima (6–2) || Martinez (1) || || 38,941 || 25–15 || L2
|-style="background:#cfc;"
| 41 || May 16 || || Braves || 3–2 || Henry (2–1) || Lightenberg (3–2) || — || || 51,526 || 26–15 || W1
|-style="background:#cfc;"
| 42 || May 17 || || Braves || 8–1 || Bergman (4–2) || Smoltz (4–1) || — || || 35,250 || 27–15 || W2
|-style="background:#fcc;"
| 43 || May 18 || || Braves || 0–4 || Glavine (6–2) || Hampton (6–2) || — || || 22,119 || 27–16 || L1
|-style="background:#fcc;"
| 44 || May 19 || 6:06p.m. CDT || @ Expos || L 2–4 || Perez (3–3) || Schourek (1–2) || Urbina (10) || 2:36 || 9,126 || 27–17 || L2
|-style="background:#cfc;"
| 45 || May 20 || 6:06p.m. CDT || @ Expos || W 4–3 || Henry (3–1) || Telford (2–1) || Wagner (11) || 2:49 || 8,372 || 28–17 || W1
|-style="background:#cfc;"
| 46 || May 21 || 12:37p.m. CDT || @ Expos || W 6–0 || Reynolds (4–3) || Bennett (1–2) || — || 2:55 || 7,601 || 29–17 || W2
|-style="background:#fcc;"
| 47 || May 22 || || Padres || 6–9 || Miceli (4–1) || Nitkowski (1–2) || Hoffman (14) || || 28,550 || 29–18 || L1
|-style="background:#cfc;"
| 48 || May 23 || || Padres || 4–3 || Miller (2–0) || Miceli (4–2) || Wagner (12) || || 36,281 || 30–18 || W1
|-style="background:#cfc;"
| 49 || May 24 || || Padres || 5–2 || Schourek (2–2) || Hamilton (3–5) || Wagner (13) || || 25,701 || 31–18 || W2
|-style="background:#fcc;"
| 50 || May 25 || 3:07p.m. CDT || Dodgers || L 3–4  || Bruske (1–0) || Scanlan (0–1) || Radinsky (9) || 3:35 || 34,079 || 31–19 || L1
|-style="background:#cfc;"
| 51 || May 26 || 7:06p.m. CDT || Dodgers || W 13–2 || Reynolds (5–3) || Valdéz (4–6) || — || 2:34 || 16,251 || 32–19 || W1
|-style="background:#fcc;"
| 52 || May 27 || 6:37p.m. CDT || Dodgers || L 1–3 || Dreifort (3–4) || Bergman (4–3) || Radinsky (10) || 2:50 || 17,190 || 32–20 || L1
|-style="background:#cfc;"
| 53 || May 29 || 8:05p.m. CDT || @ Rockies || W 7–6 || Hampton (7–2) || Astacio (4–7) || Wagner (14) || 2:59 || 48,325 || 33–20 || W1
|-style="background:#fcc;"
| 54 || May 30 || 3:06p.m. CDT || @ Rockies || L 3–6 || Thomson (4–5) || Schourek (2–3) || Dipoto (12) || 2:55 || 48,036 || 33–21 || L1
|-style="background:#fcc;"
| 55 || May 31 || 2:06p.m. CDT || @ Rockies || L 5–7 || McElroy (1–1) || Henry (3–2) || — || 2:40 || 48,097 || 33–22 || L2
|-

|-style="background:#cfc;"
| 56 || June 2 || || @ Padres || 4–3 || Reynolds (6–3) || Reyes (2–2) || Wagner (15) || || 15,735 || 34–22 || W1
|-style="background:#cfc;"
| 57 || June 3 || || @ Padres || 8–2 || Bergman (5–3) || Hamilton (3–7) || — || || 13,229 || 35–22 || W2
|-style="background:#fcc;"
| 58 || June 4 || || @ Padres || 1–5 || Ashby (7–4) || Hampton (7–3) || — || || 21,027 || 35–23 || L1
|-style="background:#fcc;"
| 59 || June 5 || || Royals || 0–3 || Belcher (5–6) || Schourek (2–4) || Montgomery (10) || || 27,895 || 35–24 || L2
|-style="background:#cfc;"
| 60 || June 6 || || Royals || 6–0 || Lima (7–2) || Rosado (1–5) || — || || 25,516 || 36–24 || W1
|-style="background:#cfc;"
| 61 || June 7 || || Royals || 7–1 || Reynolds (7–3) || Pittsley (0–1) || — || || 23,228 || 37–24 || W2
|-style="background:#cfc;"
| 62 || June 8 || || @ Tigers || 9–5 || Henry (4–2) || Jones (0–2) || — || || 11,767 || 38–24 || W3
|-style="background:#cfc;"
| 63 || June 9 || || @ Tigers || 5–3 || Hampton (8–3) || Jones (0–3) || Wagner (16)|| || 10,871 || 39–24 || W4
|-style="background:#cfc;"
| 64 || June 10 || || @ Tigers || 10–3 || Schourek (3–4) || Castillo (2–5) || — || || 11,471 || 40–24 || W5
|-style="background:#fcc;"
| 65 || June 12 || 6:05p.m. CDT || @ Reds || L 1–8 || Remlinger (4–7) || Lima (7–3) || — || 2:23 || 21,310 || 40–25 || L1
|-style="background:#fcc;"
| 66 || June 13 || 6:05p.m. CDT || @ Reds || L 4–7 || Klingenbeck (1–1) || Reynolds (7–4) || Shaw (18) || 2:50 || 28,055 || 40–26 || L2
|-style="background:#cfc;"
| 67 || June 14 || 12:15p.m. CDT || @ Reds || W 6–3  || Wagner (1–2) || Shaw (1–4) || — || 3:23 || 22,008 || 41–26 || W1
|-style="background:#cfc;"
| 68 || June 15 || 6:06p.m. CDT || @ Reds || W 13–2 || Magnante (3–1) || Tomko (5–6) || — || 2:56 || 14,556 || 42–26 || W2
|-style="background:#fcc;"
| 69 || June 16 || || Cardinals || 4–9 || Acevedo (2–1) || Schourek (3–5) || — || || 34,822 || 42–27 || L1
|-style="background:#cfc;"
| 70 || June 17 || || Cardinals || 6–5 || Nitkowski (2–2) || Brantley (0–4) || — || || 37,147 || 43–27 || W1
|-style="background:#fcc;"
| 71 || June 18 || || Cardinals || 6–7 || Bottenfield (2–3) || Reynolds (7–5) || Croushore (1) || || 43,806 || 43–28 || L1
|-style="background:#cfc;"
| 72 || June 19 || 7:05p.m. CDT || Reds || W 4–2 || Bergman (6–3) || Winchester (3–4) || Wagner (17) || 2:38 || 29,251 || 44–28 || W1
|-style="background:#cfc;"
| 73 || June 20 || 12:18p.m. CDT || Reds || W 9–8 || Nitkowski (3–2) || Krivda (2–1) || Wagner (18) || 3:13 || 24,301 || 45–28 || W2
|-style="background:#cfc;"
| 74 || June 21 || 1:35p.m. CDT || Reds || W 3–1 || Schourek (4–5) || Harnisch (6–3) || Magnante (1) || 2:57 || 42,281 || 46–28 || W3
|-style="background:#fcc;"
| 75 || June 22 || 7:05p.m. CDT || Twins || L 3–5 || Milton (4–6) || Lima (7–4) || Aguilera (15) || 2:42 || 23,168 || 46–29 || L1
|-style="background:#cfc;"
| 76 || June 23 || 12:36p.m. CDT || Twins || W 9–0 || Reynolds (8–5) || Tewksbury (4–9) || — || 2:49 || 27,157 || 47–29 || W1
|-style="background:#fcc;"
| 77 || June 24 || 8:08p.m. CDT || @ Rockies || L 6–8 || Astacio (5–8) || Bergman (6–4) || Veres (2) || 2:37 || 48,150 || 47–30 || L1
|-style="background:#fcc;"
| 78 || June 25 || 2:06p.m. CDT || @ Rockies || L 5–6  || Leskanic (4–3) || Magnante (3–2) || — || 3:39 || 48,046 || 47–31 || L2
|-style="background:#fcc;"
| 79 || June 26 || || @ Indians || 2–4 || Colon (8–4) || Magnante (3–3) || Jackson (17) || || 43,222 || 47–32 || L3
|-style="background:#cfc;"
| 80 || June 27 || || @ Indians || 9–5  || Wagner (2–2) || Mesa (3–4) || — || || 43,132 || 48–32 || W1
|-style="background:#cfc;"
| 81 || June 28 || || @ Indians || 12–3 || Reynolds (9–5) || Nagy (7–4) || Nitkowski (3) || || 43,047 || 49–32 || W2
|-style="background:#cfc;"
| 82 || June 30 || || White Sox || 17–2 || Bergman (7–4) || Navarro (6–10) || — || || 26,400 || 50–32 || W3
|-

|-style="background:#cfc;"
| 83 || July 1 || || White Sox || 10–4 || Schourek (5–5) || Parque (2–2) || — || || 29.050 || 51–32 || W4
|-style="background:#fcc;"
| 84 || July 2 || || White Sox || 3–4 || Baldwin (3–3) || Lima (7–5) || Simas (4) || || 25,344 || 51–33 || L1
|-style="background:#cfc;"
| 85 || July 3 || || Diamondbacks || 6–5 || Reynolds (10–5) || Benes (6–9) || Wagner (19) || || 34,382 || 52–33 || W1
|-style="background:#fcc;"
| 86 || July 4 || || Diamondbacks || 4–7 || Anderson (6–7) || Hampton (8–4) || — || || 31,477 || 52–34 || L1
|-style="background:#cfc;"
| 87 || July 5 || || Diamondbacks || 5–2 || Bergman (8–4) || Blair (3–12) || Wagner (20) || || 23,607 || 53–34 || W1
|- style="text-align:center; background:#bbcaff;"
| colspan="12" | 69th All-Star Game in Denver, Colorado
|-style="background:#cfc;"
| 88 || July 9 || || @ Cardinals || 5–4 || Reynolds (11–5) || Stottlemyre (9–7) || Wagner (21) || || 34,398 || 54–34 || W2
|-style="background:#fcc;"
| 89 || July 10 || || @ Cardinals || 3–6 || King (2–0) || Nitkowski (3–3) || Brantley (13) || || 44,655 || 54–35 || L1
|-style="background:#fcc;"
| 90 || July 11 || || @ Cardinals || 3–4  || Painter (3–0) || Wagner (2–3) || — || || 45,760 || 54–36 || L2
|-style="background:#fcc;"
| 91 || July 12 || || @ Cardinals || 4–6 || Acevedo (4–2) || Bergman (8–5) || Croushore (4) || || 45,485 || 54–37 || L3
|-style="background:#fcc;"
| 92 || July 13 || || @ Diamondbacks || 3–5 || Telemaco (3–3) || Schourek (5–6) || Olson (12) || || 40,007 || 54–38 || L4
|-style="background:#cfc;"
| 93 || July 14 || || @ Diamondbacks || 4–2 || Reynolds (12–5) || Daal (3–5) || Wagner (22) || || 40,419 || 55–38 || W1
|-style="background:#fcc;"
| 94 || July 15 || || @ Diamondbacks || 8–9  || Embree (3–0) || Magnante (3–4) || — || || 42,229 || 55–39 || L1
|-style="background:#cfc;"
| 95 || July 17 || 7:06p.m. CDT || Giants || W 10–7 || Lima (8–5) || Rueter (10–5) || — || 2:44 || 40,709 || 56–39 || W1
|-style="background:#cfc;"
| 96 || July 18 || 3:07p.m. CDT || Giants || W 7–2 || Bergman (9–5) || Darwin (6–7) || — || 2:43 || 35,257 || 57–39 || W2
|-style="background:#cfc;"
| 97 || July 19 || 1:35p.m. CDT || Giants || W 4–3  || Henry (5–2) || Nen (6–2) || — || 3:47 || 32,900 || 58–39 || W3
|-style="background:#cfc;"
| 98 || July 20 || 7:05p.m. CDT || Rockies || W 10–9 || Henry (6–2) || Veres (0–1) || — || 3:17 || 25,491 || 59–39 || W4
|-style="background:#fcc;"
| 99 || July 21 || 7:05p.m. CDT || Rockies || L 0–5 || Brownson (1–0) || Hampton (8–5) || — || 2:10 || 28,718 || 59–40 || L1
|-style="background:#fcc;"
| 100 || July 22 || 9:37p.m. CDT || @ Dodgers || L 4–6 || Bohanon (3–6) || Lima (8–6) || Shaw (28) || 2:30 || 31,365 || 59–41 || L2
|-style="background:#cfc;"
| 101 || July 23 || 9:07p.m. CDT || @ Dodgers || W 8–6  || Henry (7–2) || Hall (0–2) || Powell (4) || 3:38 || 40,205 || 60–41 || W1
|-style="background:#cfc;"
| 102 || July 24 || || @ Padres || 2–1 || Schourek (6–6) || Hitchcock (4–4) || Magnante (2) || || 31,047 || 61–41 || W2
|-style="background:#fcc;"
| 103 || July 25 || || @ Padres || 5–6 || Langston (4–3) || Reynolds (12–6) || Hoffman (33) || || 54,176 || 61–42 || L1
|-style="background:#fcc;"
| 104 || July 26 || || @ Padres || 4–5  || Wall (4–2) || Magnante (3–5) || — || || 41,034 || 61–43 || L2
|-style="background:#cfc;"
| 105 || July 27 || || Marlins || 9–1 || Lima (9–6) || Meadows (9–8) || — || || 20,888 || 62–43 || W1
|-style="background:#cfc;"
| 106 || July 28 || || Marlins || 7–3 || Bergman (10–5) || Ojala (1–1) || — || || 26,220 || 63–43 || W2
|-style="background:#cfc;"
| 107 || July 29 || || Marlins || 10–6 || Schourek (7–6) || Larkin (2–6) || Elarton (1) || || 21,870 || 64–43 || W3
|-style="background:#fcc;"
| 108 || July 30 || || Marlins || 3–4 || Hernandez (9–7) || Reynolds (12–7) || — || || 33,303 || 64–44 || L1
|-style="background:#cfc;"
| 109 || July 31 || || @ Pirates || 7–4 || Hampton (9–5) || Cordova (9–9) || Henry (2) || || 32,476 || 65–44 || W1
|-

|-style="background:#cfc;"
| 110 || August 1 || || @ Pirates || 2–1 || Lima (10–6) || Williams (2–1) || — || || 19,783 || 66–44 || W2
|-style="background:#cfc;"
| 111 || August 2 || || @ Pirates || 6–2 || Johnson (10–10) || Christiansen (1–2) || Elarton (2) || || 21,201 || 67–44 || W3
|-style="background:#fcc;"
| 112 || August 3 || || @ Marlins || 3–11 || Larkin (3–6) || Bergman (10–6) || Mantei (5) || || 14,484 || 67–45 || L1
|-style="background:#cfc;"
| 113 || August 4 || || @ Marlins || 9–5 || Reynolds (13–7) || Hernandez (9–8) || — || || 14,586 || 68–45 || W1
|-style="background:#fcc;"
| 114 || August 5 || || @ Marlins || 3–5 || Sanchez (5–6) || Hampton (9–6) || Mantei (6) || || 19,038 || 68–46 || L1
|-style="background:#cfc;"
| 115 || August 7 || || Phillies || 9–0 || Johnson (11–10) || Welch (0–2) || — || || 52,071 || 69–46 || W1
|-style="background:#cfc;"
| 116 || August 8 || || Phillies || 7–6 || Henry (8–2) || Leiter (6–3) || — || || 42,523 || 70–46 || W2
|-style="background:#cfc;"
| 117 || August 9 || || Phillies || 11–2 || Reynolds (14–7) || Beech (3–9) || — || || 28,651 || 71–46 || W3
|-style="background:#cfc;"
| 118 || August 10 || || Brewers || 5–2 || Elarton (1–0) || Fox (0–3) || Wagner (23) || || 18,995 || 72–46 || W4
|-style="background:#cfc;"
| 119 || August 11 || || Brewers || 6–5  || Magnante (4–5) || Plunk (3–2) || — || || 20,553 || 73–46 || W5
|-style="background:#cfc;"
| 120 || August 12 || || Brewers || 3–0 || Johnson (12–10) || Woodall (5–7) || — || || 40,217 || 74–46 || W6
|-style="background:#cfc;"
| 121 || August 13 || || Brewers || 6–2 || Lima (11–6) || Woodard (9–7) || — || || 21,218 || 75–46 || W7
|-style="background:#fcc;"
| 122 || August 14 || || Cubs || 4–6 || Clark (7–11) || Reynolds (14–8) || Beck (35) || || 45,040 || 75–47 || L1
|-style="background:#cfc;"
| 123 || August 15 || || Cubs || 5–4  || Wagner (3–3) || Mulholland (3–3) || — || || 52,003 || 76–47 || W1
|-style="background:#fcc;"
| 124 || August 16 || || Cubs || 1–2  || Karchner (3–4) || Powell (4–5) || Beck (36) || || 52,199 || 76–48 || L1
|-style="background:#fcc;"
| 125 || August 17 || || @ Phillies || 0–4 || Byrd (1–0) || Johnson (12–11) || — || || 18,975 || 76–49 || L2
|-style="background:#cfc;"
| 126 || August 18 || || @ Phillies || 8–2 || Lima (12–6) || Grace (4–6) || — || || 17,541 || 77–49 || W1
|-style="background:#cfc;"
| 127 || August 19 || || @ Phillies || 4–3 || Reynolds (15–8) || Leiter (6–4) || Wagner (24) || || 21,341 || 78–49 || W2
|-style="background:#fcc;"
| 128 || August 20 || || @ Brewers || 5–6  || Wickman (6–6) || Magnante (4–6) || — || || 17,589 || 78–50 || L1
|-style="background:#cfc;"
| 129 || August 21 || || @ Brewers || 5–2 || Bergman (11–6) || Pulsipher (1–1) || Powell (5) || || 26,820 || 79–50 || W1
|-style="background:#cfc;"
| 130 || August 22 || || @ Cubs || 8–3 || Johnson (13–11) || Wengert (1–3) || — || || 39,886 || 80–50 || W2
|-style="background:#cfc;"
| 131 || August 23 || || @ Cubs || 13–3 || Lima (13–6) || Trachsel (13–7) || — || || 38,714 || 81–50 || W3
|-style="background:#cfc;"
| 132 || August 24 || || @ Cubs || 12–3 || Reynolds (16–8) || Clark (7–12) || — || || 34,711 || 82–50 || W4
|-style="background:#cfc;"
| 133 || August 25 || || Braves || 3–2 || Hampton (10–6) || Millwood (14–8) || Wagner (25) || || 32,157 || 83–50 || W5
|-style="background:#fcc;"
| 134 || August 26 || || Braves || 2–6 || Smoltz (13–2) || Bergman (11–7) || — || || 32,651 || 83–51 || L1
|-style="background:#cfc;"
| 135 || August 28 || || Pirates || 2–0 || Johnson (14–11) || Cordova (12–11) || — || || 40,709 || 84–51 || W1
|-style="background:#cfc;"
| 136 || August 29 || || Pirates || 6–3 || Lima (14–6) || Schmidt (11–10) || Powell (6) || || 41,762 || 85–51 || W2
|-style="background:#cfc;"
| 137 || August 30 || || Pirates || 11–4 || Reynolds (17–8) || McCurry (1–3) || — || || 25,342 || 86–51 || W3
|-style="background:#cfc;"
| 138 || August 31 || || @ Braves || 4–3 || Powell (5–5) || Smoltz (13–3) || Wagner (26) || || 33,883 || 87–51 || W4
|-

|-style="background:#fcc;"
| 139 || September 1 || || @ Braves || 4–6 || Neagle (14–11) || Elarton (1–1) || Lightenberg (25) || || 31,168 || 87–52 || L1
|-style="background:#cfc;"
| 140 || September 2 || || @ Braves || 4–2 || Johnson (15–11) || Maddux (17–7) || Wagner (27) || || 46,238 || 88–52 || W1
|-style="background:#fcc;"
| 141 || September 4 || || @ Diamondbacks || 1–3 || Telemaco (6–8) || Lima (14–7) || Olson (26) || || 41,396 || 88–53 || L1
|-style="background:#cfc;"
| 142 || September 5 || || @ Diamondbacks || 6–5  || Wagner (4–3) || Embree (4–1) || — || || 43,638 || 89–53 || W1
|-style="background:#cfc;"
| 143 || September 6 || || @ Diamondbacks || 10–1 || Hampton (11–6) || Daal (7–10) || — || || 44,076 || 90–53 || W2
|-style="background:#cfc;"
| 144 || September 7 || 4:06p.m. CDT || Reds || W 1–0 || Johnson (16–11) || Parris (4–4) || — || 2:07 || 42,787 || 91–53 || W3
|-style="background:#cfc;"
| 145 || September 8 || 7:06p.m. CDT || Reds || W 13–7 || Bergman (12–7) || Bere (4–8) || — || 3:13 || 16,574 || 92–53 || W4
|-style="background:#cfc;"
| 146 || September 9 || || Brewers || 6–2 || Lima (15–7) || Woodard (9–11) || Wagner (28) || || 24,462 || 93–53 || W5
|-style="background:#cfc;"
| 147 || September 10 || || Brewers || 7–1 || Reynolds (18–8) || Karl (9–9) || — || || 20,813 || 94–53 || W6
|-style="background:#cfc;"
| 148 || September 11 || || Cardinals || 8–2 || Powell (6–5) || Morris (5–5) || — || || 52,186 || 95–53 || W7
|-style="background:#cfc;"
| 149 || September 12 || || Cardinals || 3–2 || Johnson (17–11) || Oliver (9–10) || Wagner (29) || || 52,493 || 96–53 || W8
|-style="background:#fcc;"
| 150 || September 13 || || Cardinals || 2–3 || Mercker (11–11) || Bergman (12–8) || Acevedo (9) || || 52,338 || 96–54 || L1
|-style="background:#fcc;"
| 151 || September 14 || || Mets || 4–7  || McMichael (4–4) || Magnante (4–7) || Franco (37) || || 24,241 || 96–55 || L2
|-style="background:#cfc;"
| 152 || September 15  || || Mets || 6–5  || Powell (7–5) || Tam (1–1) || — || || N/A || 97–55 || W1
|-style="background:#fcc;"
| 153 || September 15  || || Mets || 4–8 || Leiter (16–5) || Powell (7–6) || Wendell (3) || || 40,835 || 97–56 || L1
|-style="background:#fcc;"
| 154 || September 16 || || Mets || 3–4  || McMichael (5–4) || Bergman (12–9) || Wendell (4) || || 24,269 || 97–57 || L2
|-style="background:#cfc;"
| 155 || September 18 || || @ Pirates || 5–2 || Johnson (18–11) || Dessens (2–5) || Powell (7) || || 16,937 || 98–57 || W1
|-style="background:#fcc;"
| 156 || September 19 || || @ Pirates || 1–7 || Cordova (13–13) || Lima (15–8) || — || || 20,670 || 98–58 || L1
|-style="background:#cfc;"
| 157 || September 20 || || @ Pirates || 2–0 || Reynolds (19–8) || Schmidt (11–13) || Wagner (30) || || 23,657 || 99–58 || W1
|-style="background:#fcc;"
| 158 || September 22 || || @ Cardinals || 0–4 || Morris (7–5) || Hampton (11–7) || — || || 40,739 || 99–59 || L1
|-style="background:#cfc;"
| 159 || September 23 || || @ Cardinals || 7–1 || Johnson (19–11) || Oliver (10–11) || — || || 38,997 || 100–59 || W1
|-style="background:#cfc;"
| 160 || September 25 || || Cubs || 6–2 || Lima (16–8) || Tapani (19–9) || — || || 51,831 || 101–59 || W2
|-style="background:#fcc;"
| 161 || September 26 || || Cubs || 2–3 || Clark (9–14) || Powell (7–7) || Beck (50) || || 51,950 || 101–60 || L1
|-style="background:#cfc;"
| 162 || September 27 || || Cubs || 4–3  || Elarton (2–1) || Beck (3–4) || — || || 51,916 || 102–60 || W1
|-

|- style="text-align:center;"
| Legend:       = Win       = Loss       = PostponementBold = Astros team member

Postseason Game log

|-style="background:#fcc;"
| 1 || September 29 || 3:07p.m. CDT || Padres || L 1–2 || Brown (1–0) || Johnson (0–1) || Hoffman (1) || 2:38 || 50,080 || SD 1–0 || L1
|-style="background:#cfc;"
| 2 || October 1 || 3:07p.m. CDT || Padres || W 5–4 || Wagner (1–0) || Miceli (0–1) || – || 2:53 || 45,550 || Tied 1–1 || W1
|-style="background:#fcc;"
| 3 || October 3 || 10:07p.m. CDT || @ Padres || L 1–2 || Miceli (1–1) || Elarton (0–1) || Hoffman (2) || 2:32 || 65,235 || SD 2–1 || L1
|-style="background:#fcc;"
| 4 || October 4 || 6:37p.m. CDT || @ Padres || L 1–6 || Hitchcock (1–0) || Johnson (0–2) || – || 2:39 || 64,898 || SD 3–1 || L2
|-

|- style="text-align:center;"
| Legend:       = Win       = Loss       = PostponementBold = Astros team member

Player stats

Batting

Starters by position 
Note: Pos = Position; G = Games played; AB = At bats; H = Hits; Avg. = Batting average; HR = Home runs; RBI = Runs batted in

Other batters 
Note: G = Games played; AB = At bats; H = Hits; Avg. = Batting average; HR = Home runs; RBI = Runs batted in

Pitching

Starting pitchers 
Note: G = Games pitched; IP = Innings pitched; W = Wins; L = Losses; ERA = Earned run average; SO = Strikeouts

Relief pitchers 
Note: G = Games pitched; W = Wins; L = Losses; SV = Saves; ERA = Earned run average; SO = Strikeouts

National League Divisional Playoffs

Houston Astros vs. San Diego Padres
The Astros season ended by defeat in four games to the San Diego Padres in the National League Division Series, including losing two starts against Kevin Brown – one of the league's highest-accomplished pitchers that year – both by a 2–1 score.  As the Game 1 starter opposing Randy Johnson, Brown allowed no runs in eight innings and struck out 16 Astros, a career-high, and second to that point in MLB playoff history only to Bob Gibson's 17-strikeout performance in the 1968 World Series.    Bagwell, Derek Bell, and Craig Biggio combined for six hits in 51 at bats in this series.

Awards and Records
 Larry Dierker, National League Manager of the Year

Farm system

References

External links
1998 Houston Astros season at Baseball Reference

Houston Astros seasons
Houston Astros season
National League Central champion seasons
1998 in sports in Texas